Kano State is one of the 36 states of the Federal Republic of Nigeria. This is the list of Tertiary institutions in Kano State, the list contains Government and private institutions.

Universities
 Bayero University Kano, Kano
 Kano University of Science and Technology, Wudil
 Yusuf Maitama Sule University, Kano, Kano
 Nigeria Police Academy, Wudil.
 Skyline University Nigeria, Kano.

Colleges

Government
 Federal College of Education, Kano
 Federal College of Education (Technical), Bichi.
  Aminu Kano College of Islamic Legal Studies, Kano
 Sa'adatu Rimi College of Education
 Federal College of Agriculture produce Technology Kano
 Kano State Polytechnic
 Audu Bako School of Agriculture, Danbatta
 Kano State School of Health Technology
 Kano State School of Hygiene
 Kano State College of Arts, Sciences and Remedial Studies
 Rabi'u Musa Kwankwaso College of Advance and remedial Studies
 Aminu Dabo School of Health Sciences and Technology
 College of Education, Kura 
 Entrepreneurship Vocational Technology Ltd
 Government Commercial College, Bagauda
 Government Technical College, Kano
 Government Technical College, Ungogo
 Government Technical College, Wudil
Privates
 Ameenudeen College of Education, Badawa

Government 
 Kano State College of Nursing and Midwifery, Madobi
 School of Health Information Management Aminu Kano Teaching Hospital, Kano 
 School of Post Basic Paediatric and Nephrology Nursing, AKTH 
 Community Midwifery Program, School of Basic Midwifery, Danbatta 
 School of Health Information Management, AKTH 
 School of Orthopaedic Cast Technology, National Orthopaedic Hospital, Dala 
 School of Hygiene, Kano

Others 
 Adhama Innovation Enterprise Institute, Bompai
 Hajia Sa'adatu and Umul-Khairi Foundation

References 

Kano
 
Tertiary institutions